The 2020 MBC Entertainment Awards presented by Munhwa Broadcasting Corporation (MBC), took place on December 29, 2020, at MBC Public Hall in Sangam-dong, Mapo-gu, Seoul. It was hosted by Jun Hyun-moo, Jang Do-yeon and Ahn Bo-hyun. It aired on December 29, 2020, at 20.45 (KST).

Nominations and winners

Presenters

Special performances

See also 
 2020 KBS Entertainment Awards
 2020 SBS Entertainment Awards

References

External links 

MBC TV original programming
MBC Entertainment Awards
2020 television awards
2020 in South Korea
2020 in South Korean television